Sempill or Semple may refer to:

People
Francis Sempill (1616?–1682), Scottish writer, son of Robert the younger
James Sempill (1566–1626), Scottish courtier and diplomat
Hugh Sempill (1596–1654), Scottish mathematician
Robert Sempill (c.1530–1595), Scottish balladeer
Robert Sempill the younger (1595?–1663?), Scottish writer, son of Robert
William Forbes-Sempill, 19th Lord Sempill (1893–1965), Scottish pioneering aviator and Japanese spy

Other uses
Clan Sempill, a Lowland Scottish clan
Lord Sempill, a title in the Peerage of Scotland
Sempill Mission, a 1921 military mission to Japan